Maria Savenkov (born August 2, 1988) is an Israeli Olympic rhythmic gymnast.

Biography
Savenkov is Jewish, and was born in Volgograd, Russia.

She and her teammates placed 6th in the finals on behalf of Israel at the 2008 Summer Olympics in Beijing, China, as a part of the Israeli National Rhythmic Gymnastic Team.

She and her Israeli teammates placed 5th in the 2009 World Rhythmic Gymnastics Championships in both Hoops and All-Around in Mie, Japan.

References

External links
 

Israeli rhythmic gymnasts
Gymnasts at the 2008 Summer Olympics
Olympic gymnasts of Israel
Living people
1988 births
Sportspeople from Volgograd
Jewish gymnasts
Israeli Jews